The following is a list of awards and nominations received by actor Alfred Molina.

Molina has received various awards for his appearances on stage and screen. This includes three Tony Award nominations for his starring roles on the Broadway stage, two for Best Actor in a Play for Yasmina Reza's Art in 1998 and John Logan's Red in 2010 and for Best Actor in a Musical for Fiddler on the Roof in 2004. He received a Drama Desk Award for his performance in Art, and a Drama League Award for Red. He also received two Laurence Olivier Award nominations for his work on the London stage for the musical Oklahoma! in 1988, and David Mamet's play Speed-the-Plow in 1990.

For his performances in film he has received two British Academy Film Award nominations for his performances in Frida (2002), and An Education (2009). He received an Independent Spirit Award nomination for Love is Strange in 2014. He has also received five Screen Actors Guild Award nominations, three for Outstanding Ensemble Cast in a Motion Picture for Boogie Nights (1997), Magnolia (1999), and Chocolat (2000). He also received individual performances for Frida and An Education. For his work on television he was nominated for two Primetime Emmy Awards for Outstanding Supporting Actor in a Limited or Anthology Series or Movie for Ben Weeks in Ryan Murphy's HBO adaptation of The Normal Heart in 2014 and for Robert Aldrich in the FX limited series Feud: Bette and Joan in 2017. He also received a Golden Globe Award nomination for the later performance.

Major associations

BAFTA Awards

Emmy Awards

Golden Globe Awards

Grammy Awards

Independent Spirit Award

Olivier Awards

Screen Actors Guild Awards

Tony Awards

Critics awards

Critics' Choice Awards

London Film Critics' Circle

Other critics awards

Theatre awards

Drama Desk Awards

Drama League Awards

Theatre World Award

Miscellaneous awards

References 

Lists of awards received by British actor